Honey 3: Dare to Dance is a 2016 American dance film directed by Bille Woodruff and starring Cassie Ventura and Kenny Wormald. It is the third installment in the Honey film series. The film was released on Netflix and DVD and Blu-ray on September 6, 2016. Filming for Honey 3 took place in Cape Town, South Africa.

The story revolves around a dancer named Melea Martin (Cassie Ventura), who wants to put on a contemporary hip hop dance production of Romeo and Juliet to honor her mother, with boyfriend Erik Wildwood (Kenny Wormald), but her dreams of presenting the play through her prestigious school are crushed when she's kicked out for failure to pay her tuition. Searching for a way to use her talents and inspire the community around her, she rents a failing theater in order to present the dance show, but conflicts between cast members threaten to bring the whole performance to a halt.

The film, which is the second sequel to 2003's Honey, has a tenuous link to its predecessors, with no recurring cast members, and the only canonical reference to the original film is that the main character Melea comes from Honey Daniels' dance studio. It was followed by another straight-to-video sequel Honey: Rise Up and Dance (2018).

Plot
At a prestigious South African school, American dance student Melea Martin (Cassie Ventura) plans a thesis presentation based on a modern-day hip-hop adaptation of Romeo and Juliet with her love interest Erik Wildwood (Kenny Wormald) to honor her late mother's memory. However, Melea's dreams are dashed when she's unable to pay tuition and is forced to leave.

Determined to fulfill her destiny, she decides to rent a failing theater and persuade the community to support her artistic and unique vision, including childhood friend Nadine (Dena Kaplan) and classmate Laser (Bobby Lockwood). She meets a rival during a club dance battle, Ishani Mfeke (Sibo Mlambo), who is reeling from the loss of her brother and has a hardened exterior. However, when Malea asks her to choreograph the production together, the two form an unlikely partnership.

When adrenaline-filled rehearsals cause dance crew rivals and egos to get in the way, everything falls apart much like Shakespeare's Capulets and Montagues. Amid romantic love triangles and personal conflicts, Melea dares to dream and risks it all to put on a performance the Cape Town community won't forget.

Cast
Cassie Ventura as Melea Martin
Kenny Wormald as Erik Wildwood
Dena Kaplan as Nadine
Sibongile Mlambo as Ishani Mfeke
Bobby Lockwood as Laser
Clayton Evertson as Taj Mfeka
Terry Sauls as Taariq
Ambrose Uren as Dajon Bell
Stephen Jubber as Eduardo Diego
Adrian Galley as Mr Sammy Wright
Peter Butler as Uncle Simon
Brandon Peterson as Mike
Sivuyile Ngesi as DJ Zubair Khumalo
Adam Cope as Christian (R&J Stage Hand)
Ashlynn Cloete as Crystal
Jason Meyer as Zam

Production
On November 14, 2015, it was announced Sibo Mlambo had been cast with a lead role in Universal's sequel Honey 3, which would be set in South Africa, with a likely debut on DVD in the United States. Mlambo was set to play the character of Ishani, a "street-tough Cape Town local who never backs down from a fight – or a dance battle. [...] Still reeling from the loss of her brother, Ishani has a hardened exterior and doesn't take too kindly to an outsider named Malea." Bille Woodruff was returning to direct Honey 3 after directing the first two films.

Later that month, Cassie Ventura was revealed to be playing the starring role of Malea. The film was described "filled with performances, a romantic love triangle and cultural clashes", and confirmed to release in 2016 from Universal 1440 Entertainment, the original content production arm of Universal Pictures Home Entertainment. Filming through December 20, 2015, it was also set to star Kenny Wormald, Dena Kaplan, Clayton Evertson, Bobby Lockwood, Peter Butler and Adrian Galley, from a script penned by Catherine Cyran and film production by Mike Elliott. Woodruff talked about the film's concept saying the crew "consider[ed] people being more interested in dance in a mainstream way because of TV shows. Shooting in South Africa made sense with the idea of taking the franchise to a different place in the world and exploring the different dances", continuing, "[Exploring the] differences and similarities. Dance is a universal language. Plus there is a huge fan community in Cape Town which opened our eyes to a dance community throughout the world."

Release
The film was made available for streaming on Netflix on September 6, 2016, and released on DVD and Blu-ray on the same day in the United States.

 Special features
 Feature Commentary with Director Bille Woodruff
 Battle Dakota Club
 South African Backdrop
 Behind the Dance: The Making of Honey 3
 Extended Dance Sequences
 Deleted Scenes

Music
A soundtrack album to the film was released on September 2, 2016, by Back Lot Music. It features songs from Major Lazer featuring Ariana Grande, Jason Derulo, Dawin, Vicetone, The Very Best, Incredible Bongo Band, Carly Rose, among others, and includes an original track by the lead actress Cassie. South African composer Mark Kilian, the film's original score creator, also contributed with six tracks.

ome video sales to $215,521.

References

External links
 
 
 

2016 romantic drama films
2010s romantic musical films
2016 direct-to-video films
2016 films
American dance films
American direct-to-video films
American musical drama films
American romantic drama films
American romantic musical films
American sequel films
Back Lot Music soundtracks
Direct-to-video drama films
Direct-to-video sequel films
Films directed by Bille Woodruff
Films set in Cape Town
Films set in universities and colleges
Films shot in South Africa
2010s hip hop films
Universal Pictures direct-to-video films
2010s English-language films
2010s American films